Derlis Francisco Soto (born 4 March 1973) is a Paraguayan former international footballer who played as a striker.

Career
Soto has played club football in Paraguay, Spain, and Argentina for Guaraní, Elche, Huracán, Libertad, 12 de Octubre, Coquimbo Unido, 9 de Julio, Crucero del Norte and Deportivo Caaguazú.

He also earned 14 caps for Paraguay between 1997 and 2003.

References

1973 births
Living people
People from Caaguazú Department
Paraguayan footballers
Paraguayan expatriate footballers
Paraguay international footballers
Crucero del Norte footballers
12 de Octubre Football Club players
Club Guaraní players
Elche CF players
Club Atlético Huracán footballers
Coquimbo Unido footballers
Club Libertad footballers
1997 Copa América players
Chilean Primera División players
Argentine Primera División players
Expatriate footballers in Argentina
Expatriate footballers in Chile
Expatriate footballers in Spain
Paraguayan expatriate sportspeople in Chile
Paraguayan expatriate sportspeople in Argentina
Association football forwards